Palmiro Michele Nicola Togliatti (26 March 1893 – 21 August 1964) was an Italian politician and leader of Italy's Communist party from 1927 until his death. He was nicknamed  ("The Best") by his supporters. In 1930, he became a citizen of the Soviet Union, and later he had a city in that country named after him: Tolyatti.

Togliatti was a founding member of the Communist Party of Italy (Partito Comunista d’Italia, PCI), and from 1927 until his death, he was the Secretary and the undisputed leader of the Italian Communist Party (Partito Comunista Italiano, PCI), except for the period from 1934 to 1938, during which he served as representative to the Comintern, the international organization of communist parties. After the dissolution of the Comintern in 1943 and the formation of the Cominform in 1947, he refused the post of Secretary General, offered to him directly by Joseph Stalin in 1951, preferring to remain at the head of the PCI.

From 1944 to 1945 Togliatti held the post of Deputy Prime Minister of Italy, and from 1945 to 1946 he was appointed Italian Minister of Justice in the governments that ruled Italy after the fall of Fascism. He was also a member of the Constituent Assembly of Italy. Togliatti survived an assassination attempt in 1948, and died in 1964, during a holiday in Crimea on the Black Sea.

Early life and family
Palmiro Togliatti was born in Genoa into a middle-class family. His father Antonio was an accountant in the Public Administration, while his mother Teresa Vitale was a teacher. Togliatti's father's job forced the Togliattis to move frequently to different cities. Before his birth they moved from Turin to Genoa. He was named "Palmiro" because he was born on Palm Sunday; Togliatti's parents were observant Roman Catholics. Palmiro Togliatti had one sister, Maria Cristina, and two brothers, Enrico and Eugenio Giuseppe. Eugenio became a mathematician and discovered Togliatti surfaces.

In 1908, Togliatti studied at the "Azuni" classics high school (classical lyceum) in Sassari, where he was recognised as the best student in the school. His father Antonio died on 21 January 1911 of cancer and the family ended up in poverty; but thanks to a scholarship, Togliatti was able to graduate from the University of Turin in law in 1917. In 1914, Togliatti began his political life in the Italian Socialist Party (PSI) prior to the First World War. He served as a volunteer army officer during the war, and was wounded in action and sent home to recuperate.

L'Ordine Nuovo
Returning at the end of the conflict, Togliatti was a part of the group around Antonio Gramsci's L'Ordine Nuovo paper in Turin, while working as a tutor. Like the other founders of L'Ordine Nuovo, Togliatti was an admirer of the Russian Revolution and strongly supported the immediate creation of soviets in Italy. He believed that existing factory councils of workers could be strengthened so that they could become the basis of a communist coup.

Initially, the newspaper, which was founded with union backing, focused on cultural politics, but in June 1919, the month following its founding, Gramsci and Togliatti pushed out Angelo Tasca and re-focused as a revolutionary voice. The newspaper reached a circulation of 6,000 by the end of the year and its reputation was heightened by its support of the April 1920 general strike, while the Socialist Party and the affiliated General Confederation of Labour did not support it. On 1 January 1921 the paper began to be published daily.

Communist Party of Italy

Togliatti was a member of the Communist Faction of the PSI, which was part of the Communist International, commonly known as the Comintern. On 21 January 1921, following a split in the Socialist Party on their 17th Congress in Livorno, he was one of the founders of the Communist Party of Italy. The PCI was formed by L'Ordine Nuovo group led by Gramsci and the "culturalist" faction led by Angelo Tasca.

In 1923, some members of the party were arrested and put on trial for "conspiracy against the State". This allowed the intense activity of the Communist International to deprive the party's left wing of authority and give control to the minority centre which had aligned with Moscow. In 1924 and 1925, the Comintern began a campaign of "Bolshevisation" which forced each party to conform to the discipline and orders of Moscow.

Fascist regime
In October 1922, Benito Mussolini, leader of the National Fascist Party, took advantage of a general strike by workers and announced his demands to the government to give the Fascist Party political power or face a coup. With no immediate response, a small number of Fascists began a long trek across Italy to Rome which was called the March on Rome, claiming to Italians that Fascists were intending to restore law and order. Mussolini himself did not participate until the very end of the march, with Gabriele d'Annunzio being hailed as leader of the march, until it was revealed that he had been pushed out of a window and severely wounded in a failed assassination attempt. This deprived d'Annunzio of the possibility of leading the actual coup d'état orchestrated by an organization he himself had founded.

The Fascists, under the leadership of Mussolini, demanded Prime Minister Luigi Facta's resignation and that Mussolini be named Prime Minister. Although the Italian Army was far better armed than the Fascist paramilitaries, the Italian government under King Victor Emmanuel III faced a political crisis. The King was forced to choose which of the two rival movements in Italy would form the government: Mussolini's Fascists, or the anti-monarchist Italian Socialist Party. He selected the Fascists and appointed Mussolini new Prime Minister. Initially, Togliatti minimized the dictatorial aspects of the new fascist government. In the same year Togliatti affirmed: "The fascist government, which is the dictatorship of the bourgeoisie, will have no interest in getting rid of any of the traditional democratic prejudices".

In August 1923, Mussolini pushed through Parliament a new electoral law, the Acerbo Law, which assigned two-thirds of the seats to the list that had exceeded 25% of the votes. Togliatti wrote that "fascism gained power by dispersing the proletarians aggregates, preventing their unification on any terrain and cause a unification around it in favor of the bourgeois political groups". In the 1924 Italian general election, the National List of Mussolini (an alliance with Liberals and Conservatives) used intimidation tactics, resulting in a landslide victory and a subsequent two-thirds majority; while the Communist Party gained only 3.74% of votes and 19 seats. In 1926, when the party was banned by the Italian Fascist government, Amedeo Bordiga and Gramsci were arrested and imprisoned on the island of Ustica. Togliatti was one of few leaders not to be arrested, as he was attending a meeting of the Comintern in Moscow.

Exile
In 1927, Togliatti was elected General Secretary in place of Gramsci. In exile during the late 1920s and the 1930s, he organized clandestine meetings of the PCI at Lyon (1926) and Cologne (1931). In 1927 he took the position of Secretary of the party. In 1935, under the nom de guerre Ercole Ercoli, he was named member of the secretariat of the Comintern.  In 1939, he was arrested in France: released, he moved to the Soviet Union, and remained there during World War II, broadcasting radio messages on Radio Milano-Libertà to Italy, in which he called for resistance to Nazi Germany and the Italian Social Republic.

In August 1936, the Comintern published a manifesto, titled "For the Salvation of Italy and the Reconciliation of the Italian People", which was written by Togliatti. It was addressed to "the blackshirt brothers" and appealed for unity between Communists and Fascists: "We Communists have made ours the Fascist programme of 1919, which is a programme of peace, liberty and defence of the interests of the workers. ... The Fascist programme of 1919 has not been realised! Let's struggle united for the realisation of this programme". In March 1941, Togliatti told the Comintern that the strength of Italian Fascism lay not only in violence: "This dictatorship has done something – not just by means of violence. It has done something even for the workers and the young. We cannot deny that the introduction of social security is a fact".

Secretary of the Italian Communist Party

"Salerno turn" and shooting

In 1944 Togliatti returned from Moscow to Italy, and led his PCI and other political forces to the so-called Svolta di Salerno, the "Salerno Turn". This was a compromise between antifascist parties, the monarchy and prime minister Pietro Badoglio to set up a government of national unity and to postpone institutional questions. Togliatti also founded a political journal, Rinascita, following his return to Italy in 1944 which he edited until his death. The PCI committed to supporting democracy and to abandon the armed struggle for the cause of Socialism. In effect, the turn moved the party to the right, in contrast with many demands from within; it also meant the disarmament of those members of the Italian resistance movement that had been organized by the PCI (the Garibaldi Brigades). Togliatti served from December 1944 as Deputy Prime Minister and then from June 1945 as Justice Minister.

After having been minister without portfolio in the Pietro Badoglio government, he acted as vice-premier under Alcide De Gasperi in 1945. In opposition to the dominant line in his own party, he voted for the inclusion of the Lateran Pacts in the Italian Constitution. At the 1946 general election, held at the same time as the Constitutional Referendum won by republican supporters, the PCI obtained 19% of the votes and 104 seats in the new Constituent Assembly.

Communist ministers were evicted during the May 1947 crisis. The same month, Maurice Thorez, head of the French Communist Party (PCF), was forced to quit Paul Ramadier's government along with the four other communist ministers. As in Italy, the PCF was very strong, taking part in the Three parties alliance (Tripartisme) and scoring 28.26% at the November 1946 elections.

In 1948, Togliatti led the PCI in the first democratic election after World War II. He lost to the Christian Democrat party (DC – Democrazia Cristiana) after a highly confrontational campaign in which the United States, viewing him as a Cold War enemy, played a large part. Allied with the PSI in the Popular Democratic Front, the left-wing achieved 31% of the votes.

On 14 July 1948, Togliatti was shot three times, being severely wounded by Antonio Pallante, a fascist student; his life hung in the balance for days and news about his condition was uncertain, causing an acute political crisis in Italy (which included a general strike called by the Italian General Confederation of Labour).

1950s and 1960s 

Under his leadership, the PCI became the second largest party in Italy, and the largest non-ruling communist party in Europe. Although permanently in the opposition at the national level during Togliatti's lifetime, the party ran many municipalities and held great power at the local and regional level in certain areas.

In 1953, he fought against the so-called "cheat or swindle law", an electoral legislation passed by the Christian Democracy-led majority of the time, which aimed at using first past the post to augment the center-right's power. Ultimately, the law was to prove of no use for the government in the elections of that year, where Togliatti's PCI won 22.6% of the vote. It was repealed in November 1953.

Despite his close relationship with the Soviet Union, Togliatti's leadership remained unscathed after the 1956 Hungarian Revolution (which was in most countries a cause for major conflicts within the left). He developed and named the polycentrism theory (unity in diversity within the communist parties in all countries).

"Italian way to Socialism" 
After the Khrushchev Thaw in the Soviet Union, Togliatti inspired by the new set of reforms launched the party program of the "Italian way to Socialism". He said: "We are democrats in that we are not only anti-fascists, but socialists and communists. There is no contradiction between democracy and socialism."

The new policy proposed by Togliatti was opposed to any revolutionary means of gaining power and aimed at accompanying institutional action with the extension of social and trade union struggles. During the this period the PCI purged revolutionary and extremist factions opposed to the new openly reformist line. In the 1958 Italian general election, the number of Communist votes was still on the rise. In the 1963 Italian general election, the PCI gained 25.2% of the votes but again failed to reach a relative majority.

Death and legacy

Togliatti died as a result of cerebral haemorrhage while vacationing with his companion Nilde Iotti in Yalta, then in the Soviet Union. According to some of his collaborators, Togliatti was traveling to the Soviet Union to give his support to Leonid Brezhnev's election as Nikita Khrushchev's successor at the head of Communist Party of the Soviet Union. His favourite pupil, Enrico Berlinguer, was later elected as his successor to the National Secretary of the PCI position, though Berlinguer's time in office saw the rejection of key policies advocated by Togliatti.

The Russian city of Stavropol-on-Volga, where Togliatti had been instrumental in establishing the AutoVAZ (Lada) automobile manufacturing plant in collaboration with Fiat, was renamed Tolyatti (as transliterated from Тольятти, the Russian spelling of his name) in his honor in 1964, after his death. One of the main town squares in the Croatian city of Rijeka (Italian: Fiume) was named after Togliatti while Croatia was part of SFR Yugoslavia, until it was finally renamed to Jadranski trg (Adriatic Plaza) in 1994.

Agarossi and Zaslavsky (2011) argue that Togliatti and the other leaders of the PCI were fundamentally subservient to Stalin, and did their best to promote Soviet interests. They argue Togliatti was above all a Stalinist, and that he remained one for years after Stalin died in 1953 and the Soviet Union had repudiated much of his legacy. They argue that it was Stalin who ordered Togliatti to play a moderating role in Italian politics because the time was not yet ripe for a showdown with capitalism. Agarossi and Zaslavsky rely not only on Togliatti's papers but those of the Kremlin, especially the highly detailed reports sent in by the Soviet ambassador in Rome. Stalin forced the PCI to reject and work against the Marshall Plan, despite the loss of much support from Italian voters who wanted the American aid.

Electoral history

Bibliography
The Italian language eight-volume collection of works, published by Editori Riuniti, Rome.

 Palmiro Togliatti Opere Vol. I, 1917–1926. Edited by Ernesto Ragionieri, 1967.
 Palmiro Togliatti Opere Vol. II, 1926–1929. Edited by Ernesto Ragionieri.
 Palmiro Togliatti Opere Vol. III, 1, 1929–1935. Edited by Ernesto Ragionieri, 1973.
 Palmiro Togliatti Opere Vol. III, 2, 1929–1935. Edited by Ernesto Ragionieri, 1973.
 Palmiro Togliatti Opere Vol. IV, 1, 1935–1944. Edited by Franco Andreucci & Paolo Spriano, 1979.
 Palmiro Togliatti Opere Vol. IV, 2, 1935–1944. Edited by Franco Andreucci & Paolo Spriano, 1979.
 Palmiro Togliatti Opere Vol. V, 1944–1955. Edited by Luciano Gruppi, 1984. .
 Palmiro Togliatti Opere Vol. VI, 1956–1964. Edited by Luciano Gruppi, 1984. .

See also
Togliatti amnesty
History of the Italian Republic
Tolyatti, a Russian city named after him
Eugenio Garin
Galvano Della Volpe

References

Further reading
 
 Wilsford, David, ed. Political leaders of contemporary Western Europe: a biographical dictionary (Greenwood, 1995) pp. 456–63.

External links
Palmiro Togliatti Archive at marxists.org
Lectures on Fascism delivered in 1935.
Togliatti on the cover of Time 5 May 1947.
 

1893 births
1964 deaths
20th-century Italian politicians
Italian military personnel of World War I
Italian Comintern people
Italian Communist Party politicians
Italian expatriates in the Soviet Union
Italian Marxists
Italian people of the Spanish Civil War
Marxist theorists
Members of the Constituent Assembly of Italy
Bonomi III Cabinet
Politicians from Genoa
Executive Committee of the Communist International
People granted political asylum in the Soviet Union
Italian anti-fascists
Exiled Italian politicians
Italian resistance movement members
Italian magazine founders
Italian Ministers of Justice
Burials at Campo Verano